Jeremy Moon may refer to:
Jeremy Moon (academic) (born 1955), British academic
Jeremy Moon (artist) (1934–1973), British painter
Jeremy Moon (entrepreneur) (born 1969), New Zealand entrepreneur